Syed Abu Hussin Hafiz bin Syed Abdul Fasal (Jawi  سيد أبو حسين بن حفيظ سيد عبدالفصل; is a Malaysian politician. He serves in the government as chair of Fisheries Development Authority of Malaysia (LKIM).

Political career
In May 2018, Syed Abu Hussin first contested to become an MP in the 14th Malaysian general election and subsequently won the Bukit Gantang seat with a 4,089 majority.

He resigned from UMNO to be an Independent politician in 2018.

Presently he is a member of the Malaysian United Indigenous Party or Parti Pribumi Bersatu Malaysia (BERSATU), a component of Perikatan Nasional (PN) government.

Election results

Honours
  :
  Knight Commander of the Order of the Perak State Crown (DPMP) – Dato' (2010)

References

Living people
People from Perak
Malaysian people of Malay descent
Members of the Dewan Rakyat
21st-century Malaysian politicians
1960 births
Former United Malays National Organisation politicians
Malaysian United Indigenous Party politicians